Emily Skaja is an American poet. She is the author of Brute, winner of the Walt Whitman award of the Academy of American Poets in 2018.

Early life and education
Emily Skaja was raised in Huntley, Illinois. She has a BA in creative writing from Millikin University, an MA in creative writing from Temple University, an MFA in creative writing from Purdue University, and a PhD in creative writing and literature, with a certificate in women's, gender, and sexuality studies, from the University of Cincinnati, where she was also a Taft Summer Research fellow.

Career
Skaja's first poetry collection, Brute, was published by Graywolf Press in 2019. The collection, with themes of gender, abuse and identity, won the 2018 Walt Whitman Award for poets who have not published a book.

Skaja was the 2014 winner of The Russell Prize for emerging poets from Two Sylvias Press. In 2015, she was awarded the Gulf Coast Prize in poetry. She is also the recipient of a 2015 Thomas H. Scholl and Elizabeth Boyd Thompson Poetry Prize (Purdue University), and the recipient of a 2015 AWP Intro Journals Award. 

Skaja is the associate poetry editor of Southern Indiana Review. She holds a Creative Writing Fellowship from the National Endowment for the Arts for 2019–2020. She lives in Memphis, Tennessee.

Selected publications
 Brute, (Graywolf Press, 2019)

Awards
 Walt Whitman award, Brute, (2018)
 Gulf Coast Prize in Poetry, 2015
 Russell Prize for Emerging Poets, from Two Sylvias Press, 2014

References 

Year of birth missing (living people)
Living people
Millikin University alumni
Temple University alumni
Purdue University alumni
American women poets
21st-century American poets
21st-century American women writers
People from Huntley, Illinois
Poets from Illinois